Mary Elizabeth Griffin ( Hart; May 16, 1926 – June 14, 2022) was an American politician in the state of New Hampshire. She was a member of the New Hampshire House of Representatives, sitting as a Republican from the Rockingham 7 district, having been first elected in 1996. She was most recently reelected in 2020. She received her education at Pierce Secretarial College in Boston, Massachusetts. Griffin served as an assistant Republican whip.

Griffin died in Windham on June 14, 2022, at the age of 96.

References

1926 births
2022 deaths
Republican Party members of the New Hampshire House of Representatives
20th-century American politicians
20th-century American women politicians
21st-century American politicians
21st-century American women politicians
Politicians from Lynn, Massachusetts
People from Windham, New Hampshire
Women state legislators in New Hampshire